Karrabina biagiana is a species of large rainforest trees commonly known as northern brush mahogany, northern brush mararie or red carabeen, in the plant family Cunoniaceae. This species used to be placed in the genus Geissois as Geissois biagiana.

These trees are endemic to the wet tropics rainforests of northeastern Queensland, Australia.
Within the Wet Tropics region they occur widely in the mature, luxuriant tropical rainforests, from approximately  altitude and have greater abundance along streamlines.

Large prominent stipules occur at the points of attachment of the leaves to the stem. New growth has showy bright red leaves and stems. Near or at the ends of growing new branches, compound racemose inflorescences bloom many individual small cream flowers, each measuring  diameter.

The timber has value for building purposes.

The trees are becoming more well known in cultivation, for the striking foliage and blossom events.

References

Trees of Australia
Flora of Queensland
biagiana
Oxalidales of Australia
Taxa named by Ferdinand von Mueller